Trichodura is a genus of parasitic flies in the family Tachinidae. There are about 11 described species in Trichodura.

Species
Trichodura amazonensis Guimaraes, 1972
Trichodura anceps (Fabricius, 1805)
Trichodura dorsalis (Walker, 1853)
Trichodura friburguensis Guimaraes, 1972
Trichodura guianensis (Townsend, 1919)
Trichodura lineata Townsend, 1934
Trichodura longicauda Guimaraes, 1972
Trichodura recta Schiner, 1868
Trichodura sabroskyi Guimaraes, 1972
Trichodura townsendi Guimaraes, 1972
Trichodura vidua Schiner, 1868

References

Dexiinae
Diptera of South America
Monotypic Brachycera genera
Tachinidae genera
Taxa named by Pierre-Justin-Marie Macquart